Akozek (Aqözek) is a small agricultural village in Almaty Region of south-eastern Kazakhstan.
Akozek is located several kilometres north of the Kapchagay Reservoir (Qapshaghay Bogeni Reservoir).

External links
Tageo.com

Populated places in Almaty Region